Histia flabellicornis is a moth in the family Zygaenidae. It was described by Johan Christian Fabricius in 1775. It is found in Asia. It has been recorded feeding on Bischofia trifoliata.

Subspecies
Histia flabellicornis flabellicornis
Histia flabellicornis atrovirens Inoue, 1992 (Japan)
Histia flabellicornis angustimargo Hering, 1925 (Sumatra)
Histia flabellicornis azurea Inoue, 1992 (Japan)
Histia flabellicornis catobia Dohrn, 1899 (Sumatra)
Histia flabellicornis cometaris Butler, 1882
Histia flabellicornis libelluloides (Herrich-Schäffer, 1850) (Java)
Histia flabellicornis lombokensis Rothschild, 1899 (Lombok)
Histia flabellicornis niasica Dohrn, 1899 (Nias)
Histia flabellicornis nilgira Moore, 1879 (southern India)
Histia flabellicornis obsoleta Inoue, 1992 (Japan)
Histia flabellicornis sumatrana Rothschild, 1899 (Sumatra)
Histia flabellicornis sumbawana Hering, 1922 (Sumbawa)
Histia flabellicornis tahanica Jordan, 1907 (Malakka)
Histia flabellicornis ultima Hering, 1922 (Taiwan)

References

Moths described in 1775
Chalcosiinae
Taxa named by Johan Christian Fabricius